Start is a subscription-based international streaming service available worldwide with Russian-based production. The service is a part of START digital media holding that also includes production company Start, distribution company All Media and talent agency Start Talent.

START Originals includes world-renowned projects 257 Reasons to Live (Beta Film, 2020 Canneseries Best Performance Award, 2020 Rose D’Or Finalist), Russian Affairs/Gold Diggers. Another START Original sci-fi hit Better than Us after its premiere on Start became the first Russian production to be dubbed into 20+ languages and secured a Netflix Original status. Some of the series are currently being sold as formats for local adaptation abroad.

History 
Start was founded in 2017 by the producers of Yellow, Black and White — Eduard Iloyan, Vitaliy Shlyappo, Alexey Trotsyuk, Denis Jalinskiy. The company produces content in partnership with Disney Russia and other major distributors. As of August 2019 START had subscribers in 174 countries, 40% outside CIS. In October 2020 Start announced it had over 1 million paying subscribers. MegaFon (the second largest russian mobile phone operator) became a co-owner of Start in October 2020. As of February 2021 50% of Start shares belong to MegaFon. 47,5% belong to Start's founders and 2,5 % to General Director of the streaming service Julia Mindubaeva.

Since April 2021 Start has been a part of so named digital media holding. Start holding also includes a production studio Start Studio that handles all rights to its original series, a feature film distribution company All Media and Start Talent agency.

Finance 

According to one of the founders, Eduard Iloyan, total investment amounted to 2,3–2,4 billion rubles (over 36 millions $) at the end of 2019. As of 2020 MegaFon was planning to invest up to 5 billion rubles (about 70 millions $) more over the next three years.

According to Telecom Daily and TMT Consulting reports, for two years in a row Start shows the fastest finance growth among streaming services in Russia, occupying 6% of the SVOD market.

Device support and technical details 

Start's web version can be accessed via an internet browser.

Content 

Over the past three years Start produced in-house more than 30 originals, including series Russian Affairs/Gold Diggers (3 seasons), Better than Us (1 season), Storm (1 season), Addicted (3 seasons), The Vampires of Midland, Mediator (2 seasons), Passengers, Container, Offside (2 seasons), The Counted (2 seasons), 257 Reasons to Live (2 seasons), A Good Man (1 season), Sherlock: The Russian Chronicles, and films Hotel Belgrade, Factory by Yury Bykov, Text by Klim Shipenko etc. In 2019 Start original series Better Than Us became the first Russian TV series released worldwide as a Netflix Original. It was dubbed into 20+ languages.

In 2020 Amazon Prime bought exclusive distribution rights for Russian Affairs (season 1) as Exclusives and Originals after its release on Start.

As of May 2021 Start had over 50 projects in production.

Awards and nominations 

Start original series Storm by Boris Khlebnikov won a silver award at the New York Festivals TV and Film Awards in the Streaming Drama category. Text by Klim Shipenko won The François Chalais Prize at the annual Festival du Cinéma Russe à Honfleur (2019) for Best Script (Dmitry Glukhovskiy) and Best Actor (Alexander Petrov and Ivan Yankovskiy)[28]. The film won four Golden Eagle Awards (2020) for Best Motion Picture, Best Leading Actor (Alexander Petrov), Best Supporting Actor (Ivan Yankovsky), and Best Film Editing.

References

External links 
 Official website

Android (operating system) software
Companies based in Moscow
Technology companies of Russia
Entertainment companies established in 2017
Internet properties established in 2017
IOS software
Mass media companies established in 2017
Online retailers of Russia
Recommender systems
TvOS software
Universal Windows Platform apps
Video rental services
Internet television streaming services
Subscription video on demand services
Software companies of Russia
Video hosting
Russian brands
Russian companies established in 2017